There are three main prisons around Karaj: 
 Rajai Shahr prison (aka Gohardasht Prison), 
 Ghezel Hesar Prison, and 
 the Central Prison at Karaj.

Karaj